Tunicatispora is a genus of fungi in the family Halosphaeriaceae. This is a monotypic genus, containing the single species Tunicatispora australiensis.

References

External links
Tunicatispora at Index Fungorum

Microascales
Monotypic Sordariomycetes genera